Nocardiopsis coralliicola  is a bacterium from the genus of Nocardiopsis which has been isolated from the coral Menella praelonga from the Weizhou Island in China.

References

Further reading

External links
Type strain of Nocardiopsis coralliicola at BacDive -  the Bacterial Diversity Metadatabase	

Actinomycetales
Bacteria described in 2012